Robert Kennedy "Bob" Knight (born 19 March 1957) began serving as the president of Clark College in Vancouver, Washington, in August 2007. Knight previously served as interim president from September 2006 after serving as acting president of the college from July to September 2006. Knight, who joined Clark College in 2004 as vice president of Administrative Services, received his undergraduate degree in engineering from the United States Military Academy at West Point in 1980 and earned an executive MBA at Golden Gate University in San Francisco. He has done postgraduate work in organizational effectiveness at Chapman University in Fort Lewis, Washington. Born in England, Knight served more than 21 years in the United States Army as an infantry officer and airborne Army Ranger before retiring as a lieutenant colonel. His last duty in the army was as commander of Vancouver Barracks in Vancouver, Washington. Knight retired from Clark College in 2019.

References

1957 births
Living people
United States Military Academy alumni
United States Army officers
United States Army Rangers
Golden Gate University alumni
People from Vancouver, Washington
Heads of universities and colleges in the United States